The 4 arrondissements of the Indre department are:
 Arrondissement of Le Blanc, (subprefecture: Le Blanc) with 57 communes.  The population of the arrondissement was 31,714 in 2016.  
 Arrondissement of Châteauroux, (prefecture of the Indre department: Châteauroux) with 84 communes. The population of the arrondissement was 129,106 in 2016.  
 Arrondissement of La Châtre, (subprefecture: La Châtre) with 51 communes.  The population of the arrondissement was 28,433 in 2016.  
 Arrondissement of Issoudun, (subprefecture: Issoudun) with 49 communes.  The population of the arrondissement was 34,252 in 2016.

History

In 1800 the arrondissements of Châteauroux, Le Blanc, La Châtre and Issoudun were established. The arrondissement of Issoudun was disbanded in 1926, and restored in 1942. 

The borders of the arrondissements of Indre were modified in January 2017:
 one commune from the arrondissement of Châteauroux to the arrondissement of Le Blanc
 one commune from the arrondissement of Châteauroux to the arrondissement of La Châtre
 eight communes from the arrondissement of La Châtre to the arrondissement of Châteauroux

References

Indre